Anita Khemka (born 1972) is an Indian photographer. 

Khemka is known for her work documenting India's third-sex hijra community, Her work with Hijrah was documented in the 2006 film Between the Lines: India's Third Gender.

Her work is included in the collection of the Museum of Fine Arts Houston.

References

Living people
1972 births
20th-century Indian photographers
21st-century Indian photographers
20th-century Indian women artists
21st-century Indian women artists